Ricky Nelson is the second album by teen idol Ricky Nelson, released in 1958. The album charted in the Top 10 on the Billboard album charts, and has since been re-issued on iTunes.

Musical content
The album contained Ricky Nelson's first composition, "Don't Leave Me This Way", and a track written by his lead guitarist James Burton along with bass player James Kirkland called "There Goes My Baby". The album also included a cover of Fats Domino's "I'm in Love Again", along with a cover of Roy Orbison's "Down the Line". Also included were covers of then-recent hits and older songs updated for his style.  The Jordanaires provide backing vocals.

Track listing
"Shirley Lee" (Bobby Lee Trammell) – 2:00
"Someday (You'll Want Me to Want You)" (Jimmie Hodges) – 2:51
"There's Good Rockin' Tonight" (Roy Brown) – 1:50
"I'm Feelin' Sorry" (Jack Clement) – 2:19
"Down the Line" (Roy Orbison, Phillips) – 2:33
"Unchained Melody" (Alex North, Hy Zaret) – 2:21
"I'm in Love Again" (Dave Bartholomew, Fats Domino) – 2:20
"Don't Leave Me This Way" (Ricky Nelson) – 2:29
"My Babe" (Willie Dixon) – 2:33
"I'll Walk Alone" (Sammy Cahn, Jule Styne) – 2:39
"There Goes My Baby" (James Burton, James Kirkland) – 2:15
"Poor Little Fool" (Sharon Sheeley) – 2:33

Reception
A review by Allmusic said that Ricky Nelson "remained a slavish imitator of the Sun Records rockabilly style on his sophomore long-player, but he had improved enormously in the endeavor", and gave the album a positive rating.

See also
1958 in music
The Adventures of Ozzie and Harriet

1958 albums
Ricky Nelson albums
Pop rock albums by American artists
Imperial Records albums